Nina Bott (born 1 January 1978 in Hamburg) is a German actress.

Career

Acting 
Between August 1997 and September 2005, Bott played Cora Hinze Moreno on the popular German soap opera Gute Zeiten, schlechte Zeiten. She then appeared in the period drama Unter den Linden – Das Haus Gravenhorst. She then joined the soap opera Alles was zählt in 2008 as Celine Laffort, and stayed with the show for more than two years before leaving it with costar Norman Kalle. In March 2011, it was announced that Bott would join her third soap opera, Verbotene Liebe, where, in June of that year, she began playing Julia von Anstetten, a re-casting of one of the show's original characters. Her story takes place on location in Mallorca.

Other 
Bott appeared on the cover of the February, 2002 issue of Playboy magazine's German edition, and appeared again in Playboy's February 2012 issue. With Leonie Lutz, she cowrote a book about pregnancy, with Germany-related advice, called Generation Mami.

Personal life 
Bott won the 1995 Hamburg windsurfing championship. In 1997, she completed her abitur (a prep-school university qualification) at Corvey Gymnasium in Lokstedt, in the Eimsbüttel borough of Hamburg, with acting as one of her majors. She was in a relationship with cameraman Florian König for 17 years; they had a son, Lennox (born 23 December 2003). Since 2012, Bott has been in a relationship with Benjamin Baarz, with whom she has three children.

Partial filmography

Television 
 1984 to 1992: various advertising spots (Livio- Ketchup, Pelikan, Sanostol)
 1993: Jugendfilm (Youth Film) (CD-Rom), Trebitsch
 1997: advertising spots for Holsten Beer
 1997–2005: Gute Zeiten, schlechte Zeiten
 2001: Hinter Gittern – Der Frauenknast
 2002: : Nina Bott fat makeup
 2002: Blaubär und Blöd
 2002: Das beste Stück
 2002: video of songs "Die Welt steht still" by the Sam Ragga Band
 2004: advertising spot gegen Gewalt an Kindern (Against violence towards Children)
 2005: advertising spot for Persil
 2005–2006: Unter den Linden – Das Haus Gravenhorst
 2006: SOKO Kitzbühel – Was geschan mit Vera Z.?
 2008–2010: Alles was zählt
 2010: Countdown – Die Jagd beginnt
 2010: Ich bin Culo
 2011: Emilie Richards: Sehnsucht nach Sandy Bay
 2011–present: Verbotene Liebe
 2013–present: Lounge Of Nina Bott

Theatre 
 1995: "Carlos", Tankret Dorst
 1995: "Preparadisesorrynow", Fassbinder
 1996: "LiebeGehirneAbwickeln", Uwe Paulsen
 1997: "Unter dem Milchwald", Dylan Thomas
 1997: "Yvonne, Prinzessin von Burgund"

Other work 
 Nina Bott, Leonie Lutz: Generation Mami. Goldmann, 2004,

References

External links 
 
 Official website

1978 births
Living people
Actresses from Hamburg
German television actresses
German soap opera actresses
German stage actresses
People from Eimsbüttel